Statistics of Swiss Super League in the 1912–13 season.

East

Table

Central

Table

West

Table

Final

Table

Results 

|colspan="3" style="background-color:#D0D0D0" align=center|25 May 1913

|-
|colspan="3" style="background-color:#D0D0D0" align=center|8 June 1913

|-
|colspan="3" style="background-color:#D0D0D0" align=center|15 June 1913

|}

Lausanne Sports won the championship.

Sources 
 Switzerland 1912-13 at RSSSF

Seasons in Swiss football
Swiss Football League seasons
1912–13 in Swiss football
Swiss